Dumont is a city in Butler County, Iowa, United States. The population was 634 at the time of the 2020 census.

History
A post office in Dumont has been in operation since 1882. The city was named for John M. Dumont, a miner in Colorado.

Geography
Dumont is located at  (42.749475, -92.972272). This is approximately 11 miles east of Hampton on Highway 3.

Demographics

2010 census
As of the census of 2010, there were 637 people, 281 households, and 165 families residing in the city. The racial makeup of the city was 98.7% White, 0.2% African American, 0.8% from other races, and 0.3% from two or more races. Hispanic or Latino of any race were 3.3% of the population.

There were 281 households, of which 24.9% had children under the age of 18 living with them, 46.3% were married couples living together, 8.2% had a female householder with no husband present, 4.3% had a male householder with no wife present, and 41.3% were non-families. 35.6% of all households were made up of individuals, and 20.7% had someone living alone who was 65 years of age or older. The average household size was 2.15 and the average family size was 2.77.

The median age in the city was 49.5 years. 20.4% of residents were under the age of 18; 5% were between the ages of 18 and 24; 19.8% were from 25 to 44; 27.8% were from 45 to 64; and 27% were 65 years of age or older. The gender makeup of the city was 43.8% male and 56.2% female.

2000 census
As of the census of 2000, there were 676 people, 286 households, and 179 families residing in the city. The racial makeup of the city was 99.11% White, 0.30% African American, 0.15% Asian, 0.15% Pacific Islander, 0.15% from other races, and 0.15% from two or more races. Hispanic or Latino of any race were 1.48% of the population.

There were 286 households, out of which 24.8% had children under the age of 18 living with them, 52.8% were married couples living together, 6.6% had a female householder with no husband present, and 37.1% were non-families. 33.2% of all households were made up of individuals, and 23.8% had someone living alone who was 65 years of age or older. The average household size was 2.23 and the average family size was 2.84.

In the city, the population was spread out, with 21.4% under the age of 18, 5.0% from 18 to 24, 20.9% from 25 to 44, 20.3% from 45 to 64, and 32.4% who were 65 years of age or older. The median age was 47 years. For every 100 females, there were 85.7 males. For every 100 females age 18 and over, there were 82.5 males.

The median income for a household in the city was $27,708, and the median income for a family was $36,786. Males had a median income of $29,938 versus $16,848 for females. The per capita income for the city was $15,260. About 7.3% of families and 8.7% of the population were below the poverty line, including 3.6% of those under age 18 and 17.1% of those age 65 or over.

Education
Hampton–Dumont Community School District operates the area public schools. It was established on July 1, 1995, by the merger of the Dumont and Hampton school districts.

References

External links

 
City-Data Comprehensive statistical data and more about Dumont

Cities in Butler County, Iowa
Cities in Iowa